Abibon (fl. 1st century AD), also known as Abibas, was the son of Gamaliel, the teacher of Paul the Apostle. He is said by some sources to have been baptized with his father and his brother Nicodemus. They are regarded as saints of the Catholic Church. The finding of their relics was celebrated as a feast day on August 3, and their feast days especially commemorated on December 2 in Pisa.

Life 
Not much is known about Abibon's life. He was the second son of Gamaliel, a leading member of the Sanhedrin in the early first century. After being baptized alongside his father he died at the age of twenty of natural causes.

Body 
In 415, Abibon's body was found alongside those of Stephen, Nicodemus, and his father in Capergamela, a town twenty miles from Jerusalem.

References

Sources
 Holweck, F. G. A Biographical Dictionary of the Saints. St. Louis, MO: B. Herder Book Co. 1924.

Year of birth missing
Year of death missing
1st-century Christian saints